The Burning Spear Experience is a studio album by Jamaican reggae singer Burning Spear. It was nominated for a Grammy Award for Best Reggae Album at the 50th Grammy Awards in 2008.

Track listing

Disc 1
On The Inside (4:21)
Music Business [Unreleased] (4:45)
Experience (4:12)
Jah Rasta [Unreleased] (3:09)
Burning Reggae (4:27)
Part Two: Marcus Garvey [Recorded In Australia] (7:08)
Institution [Jamaica Version] (3:29)
Business Dub (4:46)
My Roots [Jamaica Version] (4:21)
Part Two: Loving Day [Unreleased] (4:06)
Part Two: Driver [Recorded In Australia] (6:59)
Cry Blood [Jamaica Version] (5:06)

Disc 2
I Am In [Unreleased] (4:08)
Part Two: Man In The Hills [Recorded In Australia] (7:19)
So Clean [Unreleased] (2:29)
Negril (4:06)
Pieces Of Dub (3:24)
Repartition [Jamaica Version] (3:41)
Part Two: Happy Day (7:30)
Throw Down Your Arms [Jamaica Version] (4:05)
Trust (3:57)
Part Two: Creation Rebel (6:54)
Come In Peace (4:21)
Part Two: Door Peep [Recorded In Albuquerque, New Mexico] (8:21)
Part Two: We Been There (7:24)

Disc 3
[Bonus Material] [DVD]

Burning Spear albums
2008 albums